ʿIzz al-Dīn Aydamir al-Jildakī, also written al-Jaldakī (d. 1342 CE / 743 AH) was an Egyptian alchemist from the 14th century Mamluk Sultanate.

Life
Despite being one of the most important Islamic scholars of the 14th century, almost nothing is known about his early life. 

Al-Jildaki was probably born in Egypt into a family of Turkic Mamluk origin. In his writings he reveals that he spent seventeen years traveling through Iraq, Anatolia, Yemen, North Africa, and Syria

Based on a speculative vocalization of his Nisba as "al-Jaldaki ", some 20th century writers like Henry Corbin suggested that he was originally from Jaldak, a town in Khorasan before emigrating to Egypt Nicholas G. Harris has criticized this theory noting that it was never mentioned in any pre-modern source before. Instead, he notes that all the biographical information known about him- like his Turkic name "Aydamir", places of residence and native language- would make sense only when set against a Mamluk background. Harris further notes that the name "Jildak" and its derivative Nisba "Al-Jildaki" are attested Turkic names, especially among Mamluk amirs.

Al-Jildaki was one of the last and one of the greatest of medieval Islamic alchemists, he was the author of scientific works such as the al-Misbah fi Ilm al-Miftah (Key of the Sciences of Lights) and alchemical treatise Kitab al-Burhan fi asrar 'ilm al-mizan (The Proof Regarding Secrets of the Science of the Balance).

He was a prolific author of alchemical writings, of which the United States National Library of Medicine has three. His treatises, which reflect interests much broader than simply alchemy, preserve extensive quotations from earlier authors.

He died in Cairo in 1342.

References

Sources

C. Brockelmann, Geschichte der arabischen Litteratur, 1st edition, 2 vols. (Leiden: Brill, 1889–1936). Second edition, 2 vols. (Leiden: Brill, 1943–49). Page references will be to those of the first edition, with the 2nd edition page numbers given in parentheses, vol. 2, p. 138-9 (173-5)
 

Egyptian alchemists
1342 deaths
Alchemists of the medieval Islamic world
Mamluks
Year of birth unknown
14th-century alchemists
14th-century Egyptian people